Nigeria participated at the 1987 All-Africa Games held at the Moi International Sports Centre in Kasarani in the city of Nairobi, Kenya. It was the fourth time that the country had taken part in the games and expectations were high for the country’s competitors after their second place in the medal table in the previous games held in Algeria. The country did well, achieving third place in the medal table with 23 gold medals. Amongst the winners were Bose Kaffo, who went on to win medals in five subsequent All Africa Games, and Mary Onyali, the first athlete to represent Nigeria at five Olympiads.

Medal summary
Nigeria won 60 medals in total.

Medal table

List of Medalists

Gold Medal

Silver Medal

Bronze Medal

References

1987
1987 in Nigerian sport
Nations at the 1987 All-Africa Games